Alacantí (in Valencian and local Spanish)—also known in Spanish as  and —is a comarca in the Valencian Community, Spain. It is bordered by the comarques of Marina Baixa and Alcoià to the north, Baix Vinalopó to the south and Vinalopó Mitjà to the west.

Municipalities 
The comarca of Alacantí comprises ten municipalities, listed below with their areas, populations and the average height above sea level:

Subcomarques 
The Alacantí comarca is made up of two subcomarques: Horta d'Alacant and Foia de Xixona.

Notes

References 

 
Comarques of the Valencian Community
Geography of the Province of Alicante